Mulberry Lane is a pop music vocal group from Omaha, Nebraska. The group consists of the Rizzuto sisters, Heather, Rachel, Allie, and Jaymie Jones.

Charts
Their 1999 single, "Harmless", from the album, Run Your Own Race, reached number 23 on the Billboard adult contemporary chart and number 99 on the Billboard Hot 100.

Radio
Since September 2011, Rachel, Heather and Allie have hosted The Mulberry Lane Show,  Saturdays at 10:00am Central Time on Omaha radio station 1290 KOIL and online at www.mighty1290koil.com; Sundays at 7:00am on Lincoln, Nebraska radio station KBBK (B107.3) and online at www.B1073.com; and Sundays at 3:00pm Central Time on Kearney, Nebraska radio station KGFW (1340) and online at www.kgfw.com.

Discography

References

External links
 
 
 Yahoo Bio page

American pop music groups
Musical groups from Omaha, Nebraska